Gold Diggers of '49 is a 1935 Warner Bros. theatrical animated cartoon short in the Looney Tunes series.  This film is the first animated cartoon directed by Tex Avery for Warner Bros., and the second Warners cartoon to feature the character Porky Pig. The star is Beans the Cat, with Porky Pig as the father of Beans' fiancée, Little Kitty. Looking for suitable characters from the Warners stable to embellish, Avery took two child characters from the previous short I Haven't Got a Hat, turned them into adults, and, as Steve Schlesinger writes, "set the studio on track to making adult cartoons."

The short's title alludes to the California Gold Rush as well as to the popular Busby Berkeley musicals Gold Diggers of 1933 and Gold Diggers of 1935 (which were also released by Warner Bros). In the short, Beans and Porky set out to find gold, and run into some meanies along the way.

Plot
In July 1849, in the middle of the dilapidated town Goldville, Little Kitty observes near a gathering, a poster announcing a young prospector Beans about to hunt for gold in Red Gulch. Little Kitty takes the poster and shows it to Porky. Meanwhile, Beans strikes gold from a mountain slot machine, rides off to Goldville and puts the word out, making all the locals leave in pursuit of the gold source. Beans and Porky followed by Ham and Ex head off to the gold source and get digging. Suddenly Beans uncovers a trunk containing a book on how to find gold. Then a greedy bandit spies Beans' bag of gold and snitches it with a lasso fired from his rifle. Beans pursues the bandit on Porky's request hoping to get Little Kitty's hand in marriage. After a wild gunfight, Beans supercharges his car dragging the bandit, the bag of gold and Porky along and back to Goldville. Porky reveals that what the bandit stole was in fact his lunch bag.

Home media
It was released on DVD in 2007 in the Looney Tunes Golden Collection: Volume 5, and in 2017 in the Porky Pig 101 set.

References

External links

1935 films
1935 animated films
1935 short films
American black-and-white films
Animated films about cats
Films about the California Gold Rush
Films scored by Bernard B. Brown
Films scored by Norman Spencer (composer)
Films directed by Tex Avery
Beans the Cat films
Porky Pig films
Films set in 1849
Looney Tunes shorts
Warner Bros. Cartoons animated short films
1930s Warner Bros. animated short films